Imagery is the first full-length album by Canadian death metal band Neuraxis. It was released on February 6, 1997, through the band's own record label, Neoblast Records.

Track listing

Personnel

Neuraxis
Maynard Moore – vocals
Steven Henry – guitars, backing vocals, artwork
Felipe Quinzanos – guitars
Yan Thiel – bass
Mathieu Royale – drums

Production
J-F Dagenais – sound engineering

Neuraxis (band) albums
1997 debut albums